Galilee is an unincorporated community located within Monmouth Beach in Monmouth County, New Jersey, United States. The area is named for the Biblical city of Galilee and was founded as a fishing village. Located at the northern extent of Monmouth Beach, it is located along the peninsula where it begins to greatly narrow between the Shrewsbury River and the Atlantic Ocean. Single family homes typically make up the ocean side of the peninsula while condominiums and a marina are located on the river side. The Sea Bright–Monmouth Beach Seawall passes through the community and continues to neighboring Sea Bright.

References

Monmouth Beach, New Jersey
Unincorporated communities in Monmouth County, New Jersey
Unincorporated communities in New Jersey